The Union is the eponymous debut album by The Union, the English rock band formed by Thunder guitarist Luke Morley and Peter Shoulder (formerly of Winterville). It was released on 23 August 2010 and features, on a bonus DVD, the band's first concert, at the Garage in London from December 2009.

Reception

BBC reviewed the album on 8 August, calling it "a collaboration which benefits from a perfect pairing of youth and experience" and noting that it "could well be the album of their collective careers".

Music News noted that the "critically acclaimed release" was "a very modern take on classic styles", featuring "impeccable songwriting" and "uniquely powerful and emotive vocals".

Track listing
All tracks written by Luke Morley and Peter Shoulder, except where noted.

Personnel
 Peter Shoulder – lead vocals, guitar, piano, Hammond organ, banjo, slamming door
 Luke Morley – vocals, guitar, harmonica, percussion, additional engineering
 Chris Childs – bass guitar
 Phil Martini – drums
 Chrisse G and Emily Ambros – additional backing vocals on "This Time Next Year"
 Patrick Arbuthnot – pedal steel guitar on "Saviour"
 Steve Penny and Angie Jenkison – handclaps on "Holy Roller"

References

2010 debut albums
The Union (band) albums